Vikas Kumar (born 18 May 1977) is an Indian actor, producer and dialogue coach. He is known mainly for his performances as senior inspector Rajat in CID, Abhay in Hamid, Major Prem in Parmanu: The Story of Pokhran, YRF TV's Khotey Sikkey, ACP Khan in Aarya and for his work as dialogue coach in Hindi films like Ishqiya, Shakuntala Devi and Udaan.

Personal life
Kumar was born on 18 May 1977 in Bihar Sharif and his father was a doctor in Bihar. He did his schooling from Welham Boys' School, Dehradun and holds a MBA degree. He did a three-month acting workshop under the renowned theater director Barry John.

He married Raavi Sehgal, and the couple is blessed with a daughter, Rabani.

Career 
He had worked as a theatre artist in various plays, including ‘The Legend of Ram– Prince of India’, ‘The Fifty Day War’, ‘Kamra Number 420’ and ‘Khamosh! Adalat Jaari Hai.’ Vikas Kumar with the cast and crew of ‘The Legend of Ram- Prince of India’ were felicitated by the then President of India, Dr A.P.J. Abdul Kalam in 2004.

He had acted in a few TV serials, like ‘Powder’ (2010) in which he played the character of Umesh Jagdale and ‘Khotey Sikkey’ (2011) in which he played the character of Senior Inspector Damodar Deshmukh. He is popular for playing the character of Inspector Rajat in one of the longest-running TV shows, ‘CID’ in 2012–2013.

He has appeared in the Hindi films like Handover (2012), Prithipal Singh- A Story (2015), Ajji (2017), and Parmanu: The Story of Pokhran (2018).

He appeared in the popular Netflix web-series, ‘Aarya,’ in which he played the role of ACP Younus Khan in 2020. He also produced a short film ‘Sonsi’ (Shadow Bird), won 'Best Film' award at the Bengaluru International Short Film Festival 2021,  'Best Cinematography' (Non-Feature category) in 67th National Awards and was declared 'Best Short Film' at Lady Filmmakers Festival, Beverly Hills.

He is a well-known dialogue coach in Bollywood and his debut as a dialect coach was ‘Gulaal’ (2009). He had worked as a dialect teacher for Vidya Balan in ‘Ishqiya’ (2010), Kalki Koechlin in ‘Zindagi Na Milegi Dobara’ (2011), Lisa Haydon in ‘The Shaukeens’ (2014), and Aditya Roy Kapur in ‘Fitoor’ (2016).

Filmography

Films

Television

Dialogue Coach

References

External links
 
 

Living people
Indian male television actors
Indian male film actors
Male actors from Bihar
People from Bihar Sharif
1977 births